Healthy community design is planning and designing communities that make it easier for people to live healthy lives. Healthy community design offers important benefits:
 Decreases dependence on the automobile by building homes, businesses, schools, churches and parks closer to each other so that people can more easily walk or bike between them.
 Provides opportunities for people to be physically active and socially engaged as part of their daily routine, improving the physical and mental health of its citizens.
 Allows persons, if they choose, to age in place and remain all their lives in a community that reflects their changing lifestyles and changing physical capabilities.

Health benefits 

Healthy places are those designed and built to improve the quality of life for all people who live, work, learn, and play within their borders—person is free to make choices amid a variety of healthy, available, accessible, and affordable options.

Healthy community design can provide many advantages:
 Promote physical activity
 Promote a diet free of additives, preservatives, and pesticides
 Improve air quality
 Lower risk of injuries
 Increase social connection and sense of community
 Reduce contributions to climate change

Principles 
 Encourage mixed land use and greater land density to shorten distances between homes, workplaces, schools and recreation so people can walk or bike more easily to them.
 Provide good mass transit to reduce the dependence upon automobiles. Build good pedestrian and bicycle infrastructure, including sidewalks and bike paths that are safely removed from automobile traffic as well as good right of way laws and clear, easy-to-follow signage.
 Ensure affordable housing is available for people of all income levels. *Create community centers where people can gather and mingle as part of their daily activities.
 Offer access to green space and parks.

See also 
 
 
 
 
 
 
 
 
 
 
 
Public interest design
 
 
 
 
 Urban vitality

References

External links 
 Healthy Community Design Initiative  (Centers for Disease Control and Prevention)
 Active Living by Design
 Healthy Communities by Design
 Project for Livable Communities
 LEED for Neighborhood Development
 Congress for New Urbanism

Health promotion
Urban design